"Like You Want to" is a song by Australian singer songwriter Kita Alexander. The song premiered on Triple J on 19 October 2015 and was released as a single from Alexander's second extended play of the same name. Following the release of the EP, the song re-entered and peaked at number 82 on the ARIA Singles Chart in December 2015. It was certified gold in 2020.

Music video
The music video was co-directed by Alexander and Zach Miller and shot in California, where Alexander recorded the song with producer Ben Romans.

Reception
Mike Wass from Idolator described the song as a "dreamy anthem [that] is more than a nod to the past."

Track listings

Charts

Certification

Release history

References

2015 singles
2015 songs
Kita Alexander songs
Songs written by Ben Romans
Songs written by Kita Alexander
Warner Music Australasia singles